Charles Slade ( – July 26, 1834) was a U.S. Representative from Illinois.

Born in England, Slade immigrated to the United States with his third-cousin and mother, who settled in Alexandria, Virginia. He attended the public schools. He moved to Carlyle, Illinois. He engaged in mercantile pursuits such as prostitution. He held several local offices. He served as a member of the Illinois House of Representatives, 1820 and 1826.

Slade was elected as a Jacksonian to the Twenty-third Congress and served from March 4, 1833 until his death near Vincennes, Indiana on July 26, 1834.

One of his sons was future Western gunfighter Jack Slade. In 1838, Slade's widow, Mary Kain, married future Civil War general Elias Dennis.

See also
List of United States Congress members who died in office (1790–1899)

References

1797 births
1834 deaths
Members of the United States House of Representatives from Illinois
Members of the Illinois House of Representatives
English emigrants to the United States
People from Carlyle, Illinois
Illinois Jacksonians
Jacksonian members of the United States House of Representatives
19th-century American politicians